Slovianoserbsk Raion was a raion (district) in Luhansk Oblast of eastern Ukraine. It was named after Slavo-Serbia, an imperial Russian province that existed between 1753–64. The raion was abolished on 18 July 2020 as part of the administrative reform of Ukraine, which reduced the number of raions of Luhansk Oblast to eight. However, since 2014 the raion was not under control of Ukrainian government and has been part of the Luhansk People's Republic which continues using it as an administrative unit. The administrative center of the raion is the urban-type settlement of Slovianoserbsk. The last estimate of the raion population, reported by the Ukrainian government, was

History 
Since 2014, the raion has been controlled by forces of the Luhansk People's Republic. To facilitate the governance of Luhansk Oblast during the War in Donbass, the Verkhovna Rada on 7 October 2014 made some changes in the administrative divisions, so that the localities in the government-controlled areas were grouped into districts. In particular, some areas were transferred from Slovianoserbsk Raion to Novoaidar Raion.

Demographics 
According to the 2001 census in Ukraine, the town had 61,72% Russian-speakers and 37,54% Ukrainian-speakers.

Ethnicity
 Ukrainians: 65%
 Russians: 32.8%
 Belarusians: 0.7%

References

Former raions of Luhansk Oblast
1966 establishments in Ukraine
Ukrainian raions abolished during the 2020 administrative reform